Rajpur is a village and corresponding community development block in Buxar district of Bihar, India.

As of 2011, the population of Rajpur was 5,188, in 611 households, while the total population of Rajpur block was 213,534, in 32,976 households.

Demographics 

Rajpur is an entirely rural block, with no major urban centres. The sex ratio of the block was 925 as of 2011, slightly higher than the district ratio of 922. The sex ratio in the 0-6 age group was 953, higher than the district ratio of 934. Members of scheduled castes made up 19.43% of the block population, the highest proportion among blocks in Buxar district, and members of scheduled tribes made up 0.31%. The literacy rate of Rajpur block was 70.11%, compared to the district rate of 70.14%, with 80.50% of men and 58.8% of women able to read and write.

Employment 
A majority of workers in Rajpur block worked in agriculture as of 2011, with 26.69% of workers being cultivators who owned or leased their own land and 60.01% being agricultural labourers who worked someone else's land for wages. 2.59% of workers were household industry workers, and the remaining 10.71% were other workers.

Villages 
There are 236 villages in Rajpur block, 176 of which are inhabited and 60 of which are uninhabited.

References 

Villages in Buxar district